The Heidelberger Schicksalsbuch is a parchment manuscript, completed in the 1490s  in Regensburg, kept in Heidelberg University library as Cod. Pal. germ. 832. On 271 folia it treats topics of astrology and magic. A functional paper astrolabe  is inserted on fol. 103 and into the back cover.

contents:
 1v-27r astrological calendar of Regiomontanus
 28r-33r glosses on the calendar and the use of the following Astrolabium planum
 36r-83v Johannes Angelus, after Pietro d'Abano, Astrolabium planum
 84r-92r on the 36 constellations of Michael Scotus
 92v-98r on the signs of the zodiac
 98v-101v on the planets and their children
 102 
 102rv glosses on planetary hours, instructions on using the following astrolabe
 103r Berthold Furtmeyr, astrolabe 
 104r-105v the four complexions
 106r-108r the four elements
 108v schema of winds
 110r-116r book on dreams
 118v-119r illustration of two instruments of Regiomontanus;  calendarium
 120r-125v "sand art of the 16 judges"
 127r-129r astrology of Guido Bonatti
 130r-135v onomancy of Johannes Hartlieb
 137r-233v geomancy
 244r-248r astrological hunting treatise; planetary hours
 248r-259r lunar divination with 28 mansions; description of a calendar; horoscope 
 259v-271v on prognostics

References
facsimile ed. Haage (1998), .
Regina Umland: Das Heidelberger Schicksalsbuch (Cod. Pal. germ.832). In: Gudrun Wolfschmidt (Ed.): Astronomie und Astrologie im Kontext von Religionen. Proceedings der Tagung des Arbeitskreises Astronomiegeschichte in der Astronomischen Gesellschaft, Göttingen 2017. tredition Hamburg 2018, p. 168-189. (in German).

External links
online facsimile

Western astrology
Astrological texts
German manuscripts